Florence Wagman Roisman is the William F. Harvey Professor of Law at Indiana University Robert H. McKinney School of Law. She is best known for her work in low-income housing, homelessness, and housing discrimination and segregation. In the fall of 2006, Roisman was the Skelly Wright Fellow at Yale Law School.

Legal and academic work
Roisman received a Bachelor of Arts degree in 1959 from the University of Connecticut with high honors, a distinction in English and in History, as well as a membership in Phi Beta Kappa. She earned an LL.B. degree cum laude in 1963 from Harvard Law School.

Roisman began practice at the Federal Trade Commission in 1963. In 1964, she joined the U.S. Department of Justice in the appellate section of the Civil Division. In 1967, she became staff attorney, and later managing attorney, for the D.C. Neighborhood Legal Services Program (NLSP), initiating a 30-year association with the federally financed program of civil legal assistance to poor people. While at NLSP, she was co-counsel in several of the landlord-tenant cases that now appear in many property casebooks. Subsequent to her tenure with NLSP, she worked with the legal services program both in private practice and through the National Housing Law Project.

She has taught full-time at Georgetown University Law Center and the law schools of the University of Maryland, Baltimore, The Catholic University of America, and Widener University; she has taught part-time at The George Washington University Law School and the Antioch School of Law. In addition to Property and Land Use Planning, she has taught Civil Procedure and Administrative Law. She has written and teaches: Law and Social Change: Aspects of the Civil Rights Movement, 1948 - 1968.

In a speech to the National Legal Aid & Defender Association, Roisman told the audience of public interest lawyers that "it is your responsibility to end poverty — to attack and eliminate the structures that keep people in the United States poor."  In that speech, and in an earlier article entitled "The Lawyer As Abolitionist," she insisted that there is no inevitability about poverty, and that advocates need to accept nothing less than good education, jobs, health care and housing for all. Roisman encourages lawsuits to strike down the alleged inequity of large housing tax breaks to wealthy homeowners and the comparative pittance to help the poor. 

Roisman is also on the National Board of Directors of the American Civil Liberties Union (elected
September 2006 to a three-year term) after having been a member of the Board of Directors of the American Civil Liberties Union of Indiana.

In December 2003, Roisman complained about the placement of a 12-foot Christmas tree in the school's atrium "because it is a symbol of one religion, Christianity". Roisman, who is Jewish, believed the display was "of doubtful constitutionality in a state-supported law school," but her principal objection was one of policy, not law. The removal garnered the attention of several regional media outlets and drew the ire of Fox News journalists Bill O'Reilly and John Gibson. The episode was featured in John Gibson's 2005 book, The War on Christmas: How the Liberal Plot to Ban the Sacred Christian Holiday Is Worse Than You Thought.

In 2005 Roisman was accused of opposing the tenure of Prof. William Bradford because of some of his conservative views. The feud became a national one when Fox News and FrontPage Magazine, among others, continually reported on the controversy. Bradford claimed that his support of the Iraq War and his refusal to sign a letter in defense of Ward Churchill that was circulated by Roisman were contributing factors and that Roisman "engineered" the vote against him. Roisman has publicly denied most of Bradford's claims.

School administrators initially stated that Bradford never actually applied for tenure and that the faculty had never voted on whether or not his scholarly and pedagogical record warranted receiving it. Instead, the law faculty had simply held a straw poll to determine the likelihood that he would receive tenure: the vote was 10-5 in favor, which meant that five professors believed that Mr. Bradford had a low probability of doing so. The straw poll was not binding and did not involve the entire faculty. However, on Thursday August 25, Indiana State Representative Jeffrey Thompson spoke with Dr. Charles R. Bantz, Chancellor of Indiana University Purdue University Indianapolis, during which Chancellor Bantz reportedly admitted that Bradford was eligible for tenure, had correctly applied for tenure, and that he had an outstanding case for tenure. In early September 2005, Thompson stated that Chancellor Bantz had ordered IU-Indy Law School to vote on tenure for Bradford.

However, in December 2005, retired Army Lt. Col. Keith R. Donnelly, then a recent IU McKinney law grad, contacted The Indianapolis Star, suspicious of Bradford's claims that he served in Desert Storm and that he had been awarded a Silver Star. Both Donnelly and the Star independently requested Bradford's Army records, which "showed he was in the Army reserve from Sept. 30, 1995, to Oct. 23, 2001. He was discharged as a second lieutenant. He had no active duty. He was in military intelligence, not infantry. He received no awards." (For reference, Desert Storm started on August 2, 1990, and ended February 28, 1991.) Bradford resigned, effective January 1, 2006.

Works

Books
 Property and Human Rights (Carolina Academic Press 2012)
 Is Integration Possible: Of Course ..., CHALLENGES TO EQUALITY: POVERTY AND RACE IN AMERICA 16 (Chester Hartman ed. 2001); also in Is Integration Possible?, 9 Poverty and Race 4-5 (2000) and Mary Kirk (ed.), INTER-RACIAL AMERICA.
 LEGAL SERVICES FEDERAL PRACTICE MANUAL (NLADA 1989) (associate editor).
 Legal Strategies for Protecting Low Income Housing, AMERICA'S HOUSING CRISIS: WHAT IS TO BE DONE? (Chester Hartman ed. 1983).
 Chapters on Injunctions and Declaratory Judgments, Motions, and Advocacy, FEDERAL LITIGATION MANUAL (1981); member, Editorial Board for 1983 and 1984 supplements.
 Housing, Poverty, and Racial Justice: How Civil Rights Laws Can Redress the Housing Problems of Poor People, 36 Clearinghouse Rev. 21 (2002).

Law review and journal articles
 National Ingratitutde: The Egregious Deficiences of the United States' Housing Programs for Veterans and the "Public Scandal" of Veterans' Homelessness, 38 Ind. L. Rev. 103 (2005)
 The Impact of the Civil Rights Act of 1866 on Racially Discriminatory Donative Transfers, 53 Alabama L. Rev. 463(2002).
 Teaching About Inequality, Race, and Property, 46 St. Louis L. Rev. 665 2002).
 Opening the Suburbs to Racial Integration: Lessons for the 21st Century, 23 Western New England L. Rev. 65 (2001).
 The Lawyer as Abolitionist: Ending Homelessness and Poverty in Our Time, 19 Saint Louis U. Public L. Rev. 237 (2000); also in REPRESENTING THE POOR AND HOMELESS: INNOVATIONS IN ADVOCACY 21 (Sidney D. Watson ed. 2001).
 Long Overdue: Desegregation Litigation and Next Steps for HUD to End Discrimination and Segregation in the Public Housing and Section 8 Existing Housing Programs, 4 Cityscape 171 (1999).
 Sustainable Development in Suburbs and Their Cities: The Environmental and Financial Imperatives of Racial, Ethnic, and Economic Inclusion, 3 Widener L. Symp. J. 87 (1998).
 Mandates Unsatisfied: The Low Income Housing Tax Credit Program and the Civil Rights Laws, 52 MIAMI L. REV.1011 (1998).
 The Role of the State, The Necessity of Race-Conscious Remedies, And Other Lessons from the Mount Laurel Study, 27 Seton Hall L. Rev. 1386 (1997).
 The Lessons of American Apartheid: The Necessity and Means of Promoting Residential Racial Integration, 81 Iowa L. Rev. 479 (1995).
 Intentional Racial Discrimination and Segregation by the Federal Government as a Principal Cause of Concentrated Poverty: A Response to Schill and Wachter, 143 U.Pa. L. Rev. 1351 (1995).
 Housing Mobility and Life Opportunities, 27 Clearinghouse Rev. 335 (1993) (with Hilary Botein).
 Improving Government-Assisted Housing Programs, 1 Georgetown J. on Fighting Poverty 49-51 (1993).
 Improving and Expanding Housing Opportunities for Poor People of Color, 24 Clearinghouse Rev. 312 (1990) (with Philip Tegeler).
 Preventing or Ameliorating Displacement in Connection with Section 8, 14 Clearinghouse Rev. 303 (1980).
 The Right to Public Housing, 39 Geo. Wash. L. Rev. 691 (1971).
 Tenants and the Law: 1970, 20 Amer. U. L. Rev. 58 (1970).
 The Lawyer as Abolitionist: Ending Homelessness and Poverty in Our Times, 19 U. Public L. Rev. 237 (2000)

Awards
In 2000, she received the Thurgood Marshall Award given by the District of Columbia Bar. In 1989, she was the first recipient of the Kutak-Dodds Prize, awarded by the ABA's Standing Committee on Legal Aid and Indigent Defendants and the National Legal Aid and Defender Association. In 2002, she received a Trustee's Teaching Award from Indiana University.

In 2004 she was awarded the Equal Justice Works Outstanding Law School Faculty Award "for her dogged pursuit of equal justice and her pivotal role in nurturing a public interest ethic among law students".
 
In 2010 she was awarded the "Servant of Justice Award" by the Legal Aid Society of the District of Columbia. https://web.archive.org/web/20101001180819/http://www.legalaiddc.org/support/servant.html

In 2011 she received the Cushing Niles Dolbeare Lifetime Service Award from the National Low Income Housing Coalition. http://nlihc.org/article/nan-roman-recognized-housing-leadership-florence-wagman-roisman-receives-lifetime-service

In 2011she received the Trustees Teaching Award and was named 2011 Chancellor’s Professor, Indiana University Purdue University Indianapolis

For the academic year of 2011-12 she was made the S. Grimes Fellow, Indiana University School of Law - Indianapolis .

In 2014 she received the M. Shanara Gilbert Human Rights Award from the Society of American Law Teachers (SALT). She was given the award during the group’s annual dinner in New York City  http://mckinneylaw.iu.edu/news/past.cfm?nid=286

References

External links
 Florence Roisman's Webpage
 Professor's Page

American legal scholars
Georgetown University Law Center faculty
Harvard Law School alumni
Indiana University faculty
American Jews
University of Connecticut alumni
Year of birth missing (living people)
Widener University faculty
Living people
Place of birth missing (living people)
David A. Clarke School of Law faculty
Columbus School of Law faculty